Spain–Trinidad and Tobago relations are the bilateral and diplomatic relations between these two countries. Spain has an embassy in Port of Spain, which is also accredited for Spanish consulates in other small nations of the Caribbean. Trinidad and Tobago does not have embassies or consulates in Spain.

Historical relations 

Christopher Columbus arrived at the main island on 31 July 1498 and called it "Land of the Holy Trinity" while calling it "Beautiful Form" to the Island currently called Tobago. The dominance of these islands was later disputed by Spaniards, English, Dutch and French; there was even a colony of Latvians from Curlandia.

In 1530 Antonio Sedeño obtained a contract to settle in Trinidad with the objective of discovering El Dorado and controlling the slave trade. In 1532 he tried to create a settlement, but was prevented in the battle of Cumucurapo. He retired to Margarita Island and returned the following year, when he could build his settlement in Cumucurapo (the current Mucurapo) in Port of Spain. After the failed attempt to attract more settlers to Trinidad, Sedeño was forced to retire in 1534.

In 1553 Juan Sedeño was authorized to settle in Trinidad, but the contract was never executed. In 1569 Juan Ponce de León built the Circumcision colony, probably near the current Laventille. In 1570 the colony was abandoned. In 1592 Antonio de Berrio established the first permanent enclave, San José de Oruña. Sir Walter Raleigh, in search of "El Dorado" in South America, landed in Trinidad on 22 March 1595 and attacked San José de Oruña capturing both Berrio and the Topiawari chieftain.

The Province of Trinidad was created in the 16th century by the Spaniards, being its capital San José de Oruña. At the end of 18th century the control was Spanish as part of the General Captaincy of Venezuela but in the course of Napoleonic wars, in February 1797, a British force began the occupation of the territory. In 1802 by launching Treaty of Peace of Amiens the islands of Trinidad and Tobacco (in English: "Tobago") passed to United Kingdom. For its part France, which also had claims on the territory, formally assigned its aspirations to the United Kingdom in 1814.

Diplomatic relations 
Spain and Trinidad and Tobago established diplomatic relations in 1976, although it was necessary to wait 40 years for the opening of a Spanish Embassy residing in this country, which also covers Guiana, Suriname, Barbados, Grenada, Saint Lucia, Saint Vincent and the Grenadines, the Caribbean Community / CARICOM, to the Organization of States of the Eastern Caribbean / OECS-OECS, and the Association of Caribbean States / ACS. Trinidad and Tobago has an accredited Ambassador to Spain (resident in Brussels).

On 9 December 2013, the Minister of Foreign Affairs of the Republic of Trinidad and Tobago, Winston Dookeran, made an official visit to Madrid (first carried out by a Trinidadian Minister of Foreign Affairs ) to Spain. He met with the Minister of Foreign Affairs and Cooperation, with the Secretary of State for International Cooperation / SECIPI, as well as with the SG of Instituto Cervantes. The visit allowed to identify numerous areas of cooperation in the political, economic and commercial, educational and cultural fields. Minister Dookeran also had the opportunity to visit the Spanish Diplomatic School and the Technological Center of REPSOL in Móstoles and present the investment opportunities in his country with a talk before Spanish entrepreneurs in Casa de América. 

For his part, the Minister of Foreign Affairs and Cooperation of Spain visited Trinidad and Tobago (and Guyana) on 19 and 20 May 2014 in the framework of the campaign in favor of the Spanish candidacy for a post no Permanent to the Security Council 2015–2016.

Economic relations 
Economic relations are reduced, practically, to the energy sector, although in this area they are important. REPSOL was introduced in the country as of 1995, when large gas bags were discovered on the Trinidadian coast, and, after more than 3,100 M $ EE. UU. Investment, today 10% of the natural gas consumed by Spain comes from Trinidad and Tobago (it is the 5th largest global supplier). The presence of REPSOL was greatly reduced when, in February 2013, it proceeded to sell all its Natural Gas assets in the country.

Cooperation 
Since it is a high-income country, Trinidad and Tobago is not a priority country for the Master Plan for Spanish Cooperation.

There is, however, a regional cooperation scheme with CARICOM (and Trinidad and Tobago, therefore, benefits from some regional actions). The cooperation with CARICOM (the Agreement was signed in July 1999) is structured around institutional mechanisms (Spain-CARICOM Meetings, Joint Cooperation Commission) and a financial mechanism (the Spain-CARICOM Joint Fund), which executes the activities identified by the Joint Committee of the Fund and endorsed by the Joint Commission. The fund currently has resources of around 1.7 million dollars, of which 600,000 are committed. The management of the regional program is carried out from the OTC of Caracas.

See also 
 Foreign relations of Spain
 Foreign relations of Trinidad and Tobago

References

External links
Convenio entgre el Reino de España y la República de Trinidad y Tobago para evitar la doble imposición y prevenir la evasión fiscal en materia de impuestos sobre la renta y Protocolo, hecho en Puerto España el 17 de febrero de 2009. (B.O.E. del 8 de diciembre de 2009)

 
Trinidad and Tobago
Spain